Antonio Pacheco may refer to:

Tony Pacheco, Cuban-born baseball player, coach and scout
Antonio Pacheco (baseball) (born 1964), Cuban baseball player
António Pacheco (footballer, born 1966), Portuguese football winger and football manager
Antonio Pacheco (footballer, born 1976), Uruguayan football forward
Antonio Pacheco (footballer, born 2002), Spanish football midfielder
Antonio Pacheco (Puerto Rican footballer) (born 1989), Puerto Rican football forward

See also
Tony Pacheco (disambiguation)